Lomeikiškiai is a village in Kėdainiai district municipality, in Kaunas County, in central Lithuania. According to the 2011 census, the village had a population of 16 people. It is located 2 km from Kalnaberžė, on the right bank of the Nevėžis river. There is a hillfort (Krasauskas hill) in the Nevėžis valley.

Demography

Images

References

Villages in Kaunas County
Kėdainiai District Municipality